"The Changing of the Guard" is the 102nd episode of the American television anthology series The Twilight Zone.

Opening narration

Plot
Professor Ellis Fowler is an elderly English literature teacher at the Rock Spring School, a boys' prep school in Vermont, who is forced into retirement after teaching for 51 years at the school. Looking through his old yearbooks and reminiscing about his former students, he becomes convinced that all of his lessons have been in vain and that he has accomplished nothing with his life.

Deeply depressed, he prepares to kill himself on the night of Christmas Eve next to a statue of the famous educator Horace Mann, with its quote "Be ashamed to die until you have won some victory for humanity." Before he can follow through, however, he is called back to his classroom by a phantom bell, where he is visited by ghosts of several boys who were his students, all dead, several of whom died heroically.

The boys tell him of how he inspired them to become better men, and the difference he made in their lives. One posthumously received the Medal of Honor for actions at Iwo Jima; another died of leukemia after exposure to X-Rays during research into cancer treatments; another died at Pearl Harbor after saving 12 other men. All were inspired by Fowler's teachings. Moved to tears, Fowler hears the phantom bell again, and his former pupils disappear. Now accepting of his retirement, content that his life is fuller for having enriched the lives of the boys, he listens to his current students caroling outside his home.

Closing narration

Production notes
Donald Pleasence was heavily made up to appear much older than his actual age of 42.

The quote Professor Fowler reads on the statue's plinth, "Be ashamed to die until you have won some victory for humanity", is the motto of Rod Serling's alma mater Antioch College, and was spoken by its first president Horace Mann at the college's first commencement. Serling accepted a teaching post there after completing this script.

Cast

Donald Pleasence as Professor Ellis Fowler
Liam Sullivan as Headmaster
Philippa Bevans as Mrs. Landers
Tom Lowell as Artie Beechcroft
Russell Horton as Bartlett 
Buddy Hart as Dickie Weiss
Darryl Richard as Thompson

References

Sources
Zicree, Marc Scott: The Twilight Zone Companion.  Sillman-James Press, 1982 (second edition)
DeVoe, Bill. (2008). Trivia from The Twilight Zone. Albany, GA: Bear Manor Media.

External links

1962 American television episodes
The Twilight Zone (1959 TV series season 3) episodes
Television episodes set in Vermont
Television episodes written by Rod Serling
Television episodes about ghosts
American Christmas television episodes